Vranjina is a settlement, island, and a hill in Lake Skadar, in the Montenegrin municipality of Podgorica. Until the first half of the 18th century, Vranjina like other islands of Skadar lake, was one of the hills in the Zeta–Skadar lowlands.

Island
Created by a delta of the Morača River, the island is in the northern part of the lake. It has an area of 4.6 km2 and its highest point is at 296 meters, making it the highest island in Montenegro. The island is connected to the mainland by a bridge, towards Podgorica, and a causeway, across the lake towards Bar.

Vranjina Monastery is a well-known feature of the island. According to the legend, the island had different name before the monastery has been built. When Ilarion Šišojević, the first metropolitan bishop of the Zetan Orthodox Metropolitanate, started the construction of the monastery he decided that the island will be named against the first bird he would notice. It was a crow.

Town
Vranjina town, on the shores of the Skadar lake, is called the Montenegrin Venice because of its natural setting. It is a popular fishing spot. Several fish restaurants located on the island include Plantaže restaurant.

Notable local landmarks include the so-called "house of Oso Kuka", named after an Ottoman border guard of Albanian descent who died on the island in a fight against Montenegrin forces in 1862.

Demographics
According to the 2011 census, its population was 209.

References

External links
 

Islands of Montenegro
Islands of Lake Skadar
Hills of Montenegro
Geography of Podgorica
Populated places in Podgorica Municipality